Marie-Thérèse de Lamourous (November 1, 1754 – September 14, 1836) was a French laywoman who was a member of the underground Catholic Church during the French Revolution. After the Revolution she founded a house for repentant prostitutes at Bordeaux called "La Maison de La Miséricorde" (The House of Mercy). Her feast day is September 14.

Early life 
Marie Thérèse Charlotte de Lamourous was born at Barsac, Gironde on November 1, 1754. She was the first of 11 children born to Louis Marc Antoine de Lamourous du Mayne and Elisabeth de Vincens de Lamourous du Mayne. Only five children survived into adulthood. Both families were prominent and very old French nobility. Louis Marc Antoine was a lawyer (after his father) and was attached to the Bordeaux parlement.

The family moved to Bordeaux in 1766, when Lamourous was 12. There she received her First Communion in 1767 and was educated by her mother, who had attended a convent school. Marie Thérèse was educated in the traditional subjects of mathematics, reading, and writing, but also in agriculture.

The French Revolution 
With the outbreak of the French Revolution in 1789, Lamourous (then 35) became a faithful member of the underground Catholic Church. She was an important link in the network of ministries and good works that developed under the vicar general of the Archdiocese of Bordeaux, Joseph Boyer. Aside from visiting the sick, teaching catechism, visiting prisoners and helping to keep the clergy in touch, Lamourous, dressed as a peasant, would enter the offices of the committee of supervision and read the list of planned arrests and executions while pretending to clean the building. She used this information to help people escape the guillotine.

In 1794 authorities in Paris expelled all French nobility from France's port cities. Lamourous, her father, two sisters, and two very young nephews moved to the family’s estate at Pian. Lamourous would still return to Bordeaux frequently to continue her ministries there.

The parish at Pian was without a priest and Lamourous became like a pastor for that congregation. She gathered people together for Sunday worship, taught catechism and even "heard" confessions (she could not grant absolution, but she listened and gave advice). In the absence of a priest, she gave her own confession to a portrait of Vincent de Paul. Despite all these ministries she was able to live a rather secluded and contemplative life in a small hermitage on her property.

With the rise of Napoleon in 1800 the Revolution ended and Lamourous (now 46) was able to move back and forth from Bordeaux freely.

Return to Bordeaux 
Before the Revolution Jeanne Germaine de Pichon, a good friend of Lamourous, had begun a ministry of rehabilitating prostitutes (called filles) who wished to leave that way of life. This need was even greater after the Revolution, when de Pichon approached Lamourous to take over this ministry. At first Lamourous was horrified at the thought as she had been raised to believe that these women were entirely disgraceful. Her friend and spiritual director, the priest Chaminade, was at first opposed to this, as he wanted Lamourous to help with his Sodality; but he left the decision up to her. Lamourous visited the filles. While there she experienced a profound sense of calm, peace, and joy. She found the women pleasant and comforting. However upon leaving her feelings of reproach and uneasiness returned. After an illness, and a very bad dream about the future of the filles, she agreed to visit the house again, absentmindedly grabbing her nightcap as she left. On January 2, 1801 she toured the house, again met with the filles, and again was filled with the same warm feelings from before. As the day drew to a close, she escorted de Pichon and Chaminade to the door, and saw them out saying “I will stay here.” She became the Bonne Mère (Good Mother) to the filles (daughters) and the work was called La Maison de La Miséricorde (The House of Mercy). Lamourous chose Our Lady of Mercy as patron of the house.

The Miséricorde 
This was to be Marie Thérèse's major focus and work for the rest of her life, but getting started wasn't easy; the women were of varied ages and came from all walks of life, bickering, fighting, and accusations were a part of everyday life. To combat this, and to help form the women into virtuous, dedicated, sincere Christians, Lamourous wrote a strict daily schedule for the house, divided strictly into prayer times, meal times, work periods, and recreation periods. The Miséricorde was unique because the staff (called directresses) and the filles shared their lives entirely, they slept in common dormitories, dined in common, worked alongside each other, and prayed in common. Over the years the Miséricorde grew from the original 15 women, to almost 300 women in 1835 (the year before Lamourous’s death). The growth required more space, and Lamourous was able to obtain the former convent of the Annunciation. The Miséricorde would stay at this location until the Bordeaux house was closed in the 1980s.

The Sisters of the Miséricorde 
Lamourous was not alone in her efforts to help the filles restore their lives, she had a staff of directresses that lived among the filles and provided spiritual, as well as physical support. Many of the directresses expressed a desire to become a religious institute but Lamourous was hesitant. At that time all religious institutes were subject to regulation by the French government, and she did not want the government to be able to dictate how the community was organized and who was admitted (the Miséricorde was entirely voluntary, filles could enter and stay, or leave at any time they wished – government help would mean the house could have to accept women who were forced there after having been arrested for prostitution). In 1818, after consulting with Chaminade, the archbishop, and other advisors, Lamourous consented to have the directresses form a religious institute. While recognized by the government as a “refuge” (a place where arrested prostitutes were sent), the Miséricorde was able to maintain its “come freely, stay freely” policy. The first sisters took vows in 1818, but not much changed in the everyday life of the house; the sisters still shared their whole lives in common with the filles.

In 1972 the Sisters of the Misericorde merged with the Sisters of Marie-Josephe (becoming the Sisters of Marie-Josephe and of the Miséricorde) and switched the focus of their ministry to prisons, which the Marie-Josephe Sisters were already doing.

Chaminade and the Family of Mary 
Sometime during the French Revolution (probably 1795) Lamourous met a priest named William Joseph Chaminade, who was also working in the underground Catholic Church in Bordeaux. The two struck up a friendship and when she lost her previous Spiritual Director to the guillotine, she asked Chaminade to take on the role. They continued to stay in touch (mostly in writing) throughout the rest of the Revolution, even during Chaminade’s exile in Spain from 1797 to 1800. While in Spain Chaminade had received the inspiration to re-Christianize France by forming small faith communities (called Sodalities) under the patronage of the Mother of Christ; Lamourous became a major collaborator in this effort. In addition to her duties at the Miséricorde, she was also the director of the women’s sodality, and acted as a consultant to Chaminade in business transactions. Today she is regarded as the Mother of the Lay Branch of the Family of Mary, with Chaminade as the Father of the entire Family of Mary, especially the Society of Mary (Brothers and Priests), and Adèle de Batz de Trenquelléon as the Mother of the Daughters of Marie Immaculate (Sisters).

Death and legacy 
Lamourous died on September 14, 1836, aged 81. She died in her room at the Miséricorde surrounded by her beloved daughters. Her legacy lives on in the works of the Sisters of Marie-Josephe and of the Misericorde, and in the thousands of Lay Marianists all over the world.

Her cause for canonization was opened in 1911 and on December 21, 1989, the Sacred Congregation for the Causes of Saints decreed that she had practiced heroic virtue during her lifetime, thus she was given the title “Venerable.” Her feast day is September 14.

Notes

References 
 Stefanelli, Joseph;  Mlle de Lamourous;  North American Center for Marianist Studies; Dayton, Ohio; 1998
 Stefanelli, Joseph:  Marie Thérèse de Lamourous: Firm of Hand, Loving of Heart;  North American Center for Marianist Studies; Dayton, Ohio: 2001

External links 
 http://marianist.com/
 http://marianist.org/
 https://web.archive.org/web/20120328094440/http://www.soeursmariejosephetmisericorde.org/ANGLAIS/page%20accueil%20ANG.html

1754 births
1836 deaths
18th-century French women
18th-century venerated Christians
19th-century French women
19th-century venerated Christians
Marianists
Venerated Catholics by Pope John Paul II
French Roman Catholics
Founders of Catholic religious communities